Robert Barry (December 4, 1932 – January 8, 2018) was an American jazz musician. He was a percussionist who played with Miles Davis, Gene Ammons, Fred Anderson and Johnny Griffin but was best known for his work with Sun Ra and  The Sun Ra Arkestra.

Early life
Barry was born in Chicago. He graduated from DuSable High School, where he studied under Captain Walter Dyett.

Career 
Barry joined the Sun Ra Arkestra in the 1950s appearing on albums such as We Travel the Space Ways, Nubians of Plutonia, and Sun Song but when the Arkestra moved to New York City in 1961 Barry stayed in Chicago ending his tenure with the band.

References

2018 deaths
Musicians from Chicago
African-American drummers
American jazz drummers
African-American jazz musicians
Sun Ra Arkestra members
20th-century African-American musicians
20th-century American musicians
1932 births